West Africa Advanced School of Theology or WAAST, located in Lomé, Togo, is a Pentecostal Bible college.  It is affiliated with the Assemblies of God.

History

The school was founded in 1971 under the name of CSTAO by the Assemblies of God. In 2009, a partnership is established with the University of Lomé.
. In 2010, Mary Ballenger becomes the president of the school.

Programs
The school offers programs in evangelical Christian theology, whose
licentiate and master

References

External links
Official Site

Assemblies of God seminaries and theological colleges
Seminaries and theological colleges in Togo
Educational institutions established in 1971